The 39th Karlovy Vary International Film Festival took place from 2 to 10 July 2004. The Crystal Globe was won by A Children's Story, an Italian drama film directed by Andrea and Antonio Frazzi. The second prize, the Special Jury Prize was won by Here, a Croatian drama film directed by Zrinko Ogresta.

Juries
The following people formed the juries of the festival: 
Main competition
 Al Ruban, Jury President (USA)
 Florinda Bolkan (Italy)
 Simon Field (UK)
 Katarzyna Figura (Poland)
 Hong Sang-soo (South Korea)
 Vladmir Maškov (Russia)
 Alice Nellis (Czech Republic)
Documentaries
 Bruno Aščuks, president (Latvia)
 Alexander Gutman (Russia)
 Miroslav Janek (Czech Republic)
 Ruth Mader (Austria)
 Dennis West (USA)

Official selection awards

The following feature films and people received the official selection awards:
 Crystal Globe (Grand Prix) - A Children's Story by Andrea and Antonio Frazzi (Italy)
 Special Jury Prize - Here (Tu) by Zrinko Ogresta (Croatia, Bosnia and Herzegovina)
 Best Director Award - Xavier Bermúdez for León and Olvido (Spain)
 Best Actress Award (ex aequo) - Karen-Lise Mynster for her role in Aftermath (Denmark) and Marta Larralde for her role in León and Olvido (Spain)
 Best Actor Award - Max Riemelt for his role in Before the Fall (Germany)

Other statutory awards
Other statutory awards that were conferred at the festival:
 Best documentary film (over 30 min.) -  (I do not regret anything) by Theodora Remundová (Czech Republic)
 Best documentary film (under 30 min.) - Wedding of Silence by Pavel Medvedev (Russia)
 Special Jury Prize - Days Under by Jiska Rickels (Netherlands)
 Crystal Globe for Outstanding Artistic Contribution to World Cinema - Harvey Keitel (USA), Miroslav Ondříček (Czech Republic), Roman Polanski (Poland, France)
 Award of the Town of Karlovy Vary - Jacqueline Bisset (USA)
 Award of the Karlovy Vary District - Jiří Bartoška
 Ecumenical Jury Prize for Extraordinary Contributions - Eva Zaoralová
 Právo Audience Award - The Story of the Weeping Camel by Byambasuren Davaa and Luigi Falorni (Germany, Mongolia)

Non-statutory awards
The following non-statutory awards were conferred at the festival:
 FIPRESCI International Critics Award: My Step Brother Frankenstein by Valery Todorovsky (Russia)
 FICC - The Don Quixote Prize: The Riverside by Alireza Amini (Iran)
 Special Mention: Aftermath by Paprika Steen (Denmark)
 Ecumenical Jury Award: Cavedweller by Lisa Cholodenko (USA)
 Philip Morris Film Award: Witnesses by Vinko Brešan (Croatia)
 Czech TV Award - Independent Camera: Dandelion by Mark Milgard (USA)

References

2004 film awards
Karlovy Vary International Film Festival